Kayahan is a village in the Kulp District of Diyarbakır Province in Turkey.

References

 Villages in Kulp District